Innaleyude Baakki is a 1988 Indian Malayalam film, directed by P. A. Bakker. The film stars Captain Raju, Devan, Geetha and Sreenath in the lead roles. The film has musical score by G. Devarajan.

Cast
Captain Raju as Doctor 
Devan as Advocate Rajasekharan
Geetha as Sumathy
Sreenath as Balu
Chithrabhanu K. as Balu's friend
Sukumari as Rajasekharan's mother
Mini Arun as Vandana
Mala Aravindan as Sankunni
TP Radhamani as Doctor's wife

Plot
Advocate Rajasekharan and his wife Sumathy have remained separate for unknown reasons. Their daughter Vandana has been staying with Sumathi and she has never seen her father as her mother Sumathy has never revealed details of her father except that his name is Rajasekharan. Vandana has an affair with her trainer Balu.

Soundtrack
The music was composed by G. Devarajan and the lyrics were written by Yusufali Kechery.

References

External links
 

1988 films
1980s Malayalam-language films
Films directed by P. A. Backer